Pedro Antón Serra (1585–1632) was a Roman Catholic prelate who served as Bishop of Lérida (1621–1632).

Biography
Pedro Antón Serra was born in Zaragoza, Spain in 1585.
On 19 Apr 1621, he was appointed during the papacy of Pope Gregory XV as Bishop of Lérida.
On 1 Aug 1621, he was consecrated bishop by Andrés Balaguer Salvador, Bishop of Orihuela, with Miguel Angulo Gómez de Carvajal, Titular Bishop of Coronea, and Tomás Espinosa, Titular Bishop of Marocco o Marruecoswith, serving as co-consecrators. 
He served as Bishop of Lérida until his death on 17 Feb 1632.

References

External links and additional sources
 (for Chronology of Bishops) 
 (for Chronology of Bishops) 

17th-century Roman Catholic bishops in Spain
Bishops appointed by Pope Gregory XV
Bishops of Lleida
1585 births
1632 deaths